Jonathan "Jack" Murdock is a fictional character appearing in American comic books published by Marvel Comics. He is the father of Matthew "Matt" Murdock (Daredevil) and his magically created twin brother Michael "Mike" Murdock, and the ex-husband of Maggie Murdock.

He has been portrayed by Scott L. Schwartz in Spider-Man (2002) and David Keith in Daredevil (2003). Jack Murdock was also portrayed by John Patrick Hayden in the first and third seasons of the Marvel Television production streaming television series Daredevil, set in the Marvel Cinematic Universe (MCU).

Publication history
Jack Murdock first appeared in Daredevil #1 and was created by Stan Lee and Bill Everett.

Fictional character biography
Born Jonathan Murdock, he went by Jack for short, and lived an average life in New York. He eventually met and fell in love with a woman named Maggie Grace, which led to the birth of a son, Matt. Although their life was good together, Maggie eventually divorced him and went on to join a convent, becoming a nun.

Jack didn't want Matt growing up hating his mother for leaving them and decided to tell him she died when he was little. From then on, Jack raised Matt as a single parent by becoming a boxer fighting other boxers like Happy Hogan and others while doing the best that he could to support Matt.

As time went by, Jack found it hard to support his son on boxing alone and ended up going to a local mobster named Roscoe Sweeney, known as the "Fixer" because he fixed boxing matches to make money off of them. Jack made an agreement with him: Jack would be one of his enforcers, and in return, Sweeney would fix his fights so that Jack would win and make more money.

When Matt saw his father in the pupil of his eye roughing up someone for money to give to the Fixer, he fled from the scene in shock and got into a car accident, when he saved an old blind man from getting hit by a truck carrying radioactive chemicals. Blinded by the chemicals, Matt developed superhuman senses. Heartbroken by what he put his son through, Jack vowed to never work for the Fixer again and helped Matt adjust to his blindness, unaware of his powers.

Matt soon entered college and law school, studying to become a lawyer, while Jack continued to be a boxer. Unfortunately, Jack soon became involved with Roscoe Sweeney again when he returned to town; Sweeney revealed that Jack actually still worked for him, by showing him that all the fights he won over the years were the result of Sweeney fixing his matches so that Jack would win and he could make more money off him in return.

But this time, Sweeney paid Jack to lose the match. Jack reluctantly accepted the deal. But as the fight started he saw Matt in the crowd cheering him on. Knowing he couldn't disappoint his son, Jack rebelled against the Fixer's orders and won the fight with all his might in Matt's honor. In retaliation, Sweeney had Slade and the rest of his men ambush and kill Jack as he left the gym.

Thereafter, Matt Murdock put his powers and training to use as the crime-fighter Daredevil and brought his father's killers to justice.

Since then, Jack Murdock has appeared in flashbacks throughout Matt's life as Daredevil, and later the childhood of the magically created Mike Murdock after he uses a Norn stone to insert himself into history.

Alternate versions

Ultimate Marvel
Jack Murdock maintains the same role in the Ultimate Comics as he does in the 616 continuity.

What If?
During a 1981 What If? title story set in an alternate timeline. It shows that Jack Murdock was still alive and well. At the same time, his son Matt was involved in an accident when he was still a kid by a truck carrying a radioactive isotope. Tony Stark, employer of the truck, put the unconscious Matt into his car that transformed into a plane and took off into the air boarding the newly-completed S.H.I.E.L.D. Helicarrier. Tony spoke with S.H.I.E.L.D. director Nick Fury, who informed him that Matt's senses had become superhumanly acute thanks to the radiation. Once Matt had fully recovered, a man named Dr. Frost removed the bandages from his eyes. Much to Matt's surprise, he had been rendered blind but his new hyper senses made up for it. Nick Fury offered to help Matt deal with his blindness and newfound powers by joining S.H.I.E.L.D. and training with them. Years later, Jack was attacked and kidnapped in his apartment by a Life Model decoy created by Hydra and modeled after Matt and held prisoner in their base. Matt soon found out and tracked him down to the Hydra facility holding him and defeated several Hydra agents before finding Jack. After that, Hydra agents surrounded both Jack and Matt; but S.H.I.E.L.D. agents soon came to the rescue and began their attack on the Hydra base by gassing the room, while Matt handed his father a gas mask and they both made it to safety while being picked up by S.H.I.E.L.D.; Jack said that now that Matt was a S.H.I.E.L.D. agent, Jack didn't have to sign up with the Fixer to support him, but also reminded Matt about the promise he made to his mother about becoming someone important in life. Matt responded he would; and that no one would know that Matt Murdock was a S.H.I.E.L.D. agent in disguise, they would only know him by his old nickname as a kid: Daredevil.

Powers and abilities
Jack Murdock had no superhuman abilities. But he was a trained athlete and professional boxer with good stamina which he continued to maintain even as he grew older.

In other media

Television
 Jack Murdock appeared in a flashback in the Spider-Man television series episode "Framed." While staying at Matt Murdock's apartment, Peter Parker listens as Matt tells him that his father was a boxer who tried his best to support them both, while Matt was growing up. During that time, he fell in with the Kingpin who forced him to be one of his thugs roughing people up for money through intimidation and fear. Matt saw this by accident and ran away accidentally getting hit by radioactive chemicals being transported illegally through the city by the Kingpin in secret. Matt became blinded. But his other senses became superhuman because of it. Jack was stricken with grief and vowed to make things right by bringing the Kingpin in to justice. He tried uncovering his illegal activities and bringing the information to the police. The Kingpin's men found out, caught him, and killed him on the Kingpin's orders off-screen. After that, Matt was found by Stick who trained him to control his powers and fight in the martial arts while using acrobatics, which lead Matt to become Daredevil.
 Jack Murdock appears in flashbacks in the first season of Daredevil, where portrayed by John Patrick Hayden. Like the comics, Jack is a struggling boxer who keeps trying to raise his son right and encourage him to study and get good grades. Working for Roscoe Sweeney (The Fixer), he is paid to take dives in fights and Matt takes time to patch him up after them. After Matt is blinded in a car accident, Jack spends most of his time helping Matt cope with his situation of being blinded and learning how to adjust to it. As Jack and Matt learn to deal with Matt's new condition, Jack is approached by Sweeney and his partner Silke, who want him to take a dive in the fifth round during a match against Carl "The Crusher" Creel; they're betting against Jack and hoping to get a bigger payday, offering to give a share to Jack knowing it could help him and Matt with financial problems. Jack reluctantly agrees to do it, thinking he doesn't have any other choice. Jack later receives a new boxing robe for him to wear when he steps into the ring. After some words of encouragement from Matt, Jack decides to not listen to Sweeney's instructions, and win the fight for Matt and show him that he isn't weak. Before the fight, Jack calls his bookie from the gym's payphone and tells him to put all bets on him and to transfer the money to an account in Matt's name when he wins. He also calls his ex-wife and tells her to take Matt in and take care of him too. After fighting Creel to a standstill, Jack hurries to his locker room at the back of the arena in secret and tries his best to run away in panic. Sweeney sends assassins who gun down Jack in an alleyway. Matt finds the body shortly after the police find it. Matt uses the money earned through the bets that Jack made before the match to go through law school and become a successful lawyer while also training with Stick and eventually becoming the superhero Daredevil. In the third season, Jack appears in a hallucination that Matt Murdock interacts with when he is at Fogwell's Gym. He explains to Matt about the day when he met Maggie and how she gave birth to him; Jack also appears in flashbacks exploring his relationship with Maggie, her postpartum depression following Matt's birth, and return to being a nun.

Film
 In the novelization of Spider-Man, Jack Murdock is the identified wrestler that Peter Parker sees being carted away by paramedics complaining about his injured leg. He was portrayed by Scott L. Schwartz, who was uncredited for the role.
 Jack Murdock appeared in the Daredevil movie 2003 portrayed by actor David L. Keith. In the film, he was an aging boxer just like in the comics and was always trying to support his son Matt as best as he could by encouraging him to stay out of fights and focus on his studies. His nickname in the ring was Jack "The Devil" Murdock instead of "Battlin' Jack" like in the comics. He was a good and honest man, but made wrong choices to make money, working for a local mobster named Falon who fixed boxing matches and reluctantly acting as an enforcer, taking money through intimidation. One day as a child on his way home from school, Matt sees his father intimidating someone; shocked, Matt runs away from the scene, and gets struck by radioactive waste from an accident at a nearby construction site. Matt is blinded by the radioactive waste; Jack, remorseful, promises to Matt that he will stay out of trouble. Some time later, Jack is successfully boxing again, when he is approached by the mob who tell him that he has been winning because they have been fixing his fights; and now they want him to take a dive in his next match. Jack reluctantly agrees, but when he sees his son in the crowd cheering him, Jack chooses not to throw the fight and eventually wins. In retaliation, the mobster has him killed outside the arena's back entrance; Jack's murderer is later revealed to be the future Kingpin, Wilson Fisk.

References

External links
 
 
 
 
 

1964 comics debuts
Characters created by Stan Lee
Characters created by Bill Everett
Comics characters introduced in 1964
Crime comics
Daredevil (Marvel Comics)
Fictional characters from New York City
Fictional murdered people
Fictional professional boxers
Marvel Comics film characters
Marvel Comics martial artists
Marvel Comics titles
Marvel Comics male characters